Scott Cram (born 30 January 1977) is a former Scotland international rugby league footballer who played as a forward in the 1990s and 2000s. A Scotland international representative forward, he played his club football in Australasia's National Rugby League for the Illawarra Steelers, and in the Super League for the London Broncos.

Background
Cram was born in Wollongong, New South Wales, Australia.

Playing career
Cram was named the 1997 ARL season's rookie of the year. After moving to the United Kingdom he became a Scotland international and represented them at the 2000 Rugby League World Cup.

References

External links
NRL stats
NRL points
London Broncos profile
SCOTLAND RUGBY LEAGUE INTERNATIONAL HONOURS BOARD

1977 births
Living people
Australian people of Scottish descent
Australian rugby league players
Illawarra Steelers players
London Broncos players
Rugby league players from Wollongong
Rugby league props
Rugby league second-rows
Scotland national rugby league team players